Daniel Hall is a USA TODAY and Wall Street Journal Bestselling author, speaker, consultant, coach, and lawyer (JD from Texas Tech University), nurse (BSN from University of Texas at El Paso) and host of the Real Fast Results podcast. He is also the creator of the popular "Real Fast" training programs designed to help authors, speakers, coaches, consultants, trainers, Internet marketers and entrepreneurs.

His first product was Speak on Cruise Ships, a book designed to help speakers on luxury cruise ships worldwide.  He is also the author of Real Fast Writing: How To Write Faster 25 of the Hottest, Easy-to-Implement, Under the Radar Strategies, You Can Use NOW to Write More, Write Better and Write with Panache|

Hall created other products under the "Real Fast" brand including – Real Fast Social Graphics (with John Kremer), Real Fast Hollywood Deal (with Hollywood producer and literary agent Ken Atchity, Real Fast Doodle Profits (with New Yorker Magazine cartoonist Lisa Rothstein), Real Fast Library Marketing and Real Fast Indie Book Marketing (with USA Today bestselling author Amy Collins). Hall has spoken at events with Brian Tracy, Mark Victor Hansen, Tom Antion, Barbara DeAngelis and is an enrichment speaker for Celebrity Cruise Lines "Beyond the Podium" program and Lines enrichment program.

Career
Hall received his JD from Texas Tech University and Bachelor of Science in Nursing from the University of Texas at El Paso.

Hall started his career as a publisher with his first product Speak on Cruise Ships program which targeted public speakers to help them use their speaking skills to get booked on luxury cruise ships around the world on a quid pro quo basis.

From his knowledge gained about writing, publishing and marketing as the Speak on Cruise Ships program progressed, Hall started to develop and publish other books and programs such as the Real Fast Book which delved into teaching how to write, publish and profit from books.

Hall expanded the Real Fast as a brand to further write and publish another set of courses: Read Fast Audio Book, Real Fast Book Marketing (with John Kremer), Real Fast Webinars (with Tom Antion), Real Fast DVD (with Mike Stewart) and Real Fast Library Marketing (with Amy Collins).

Hall also serves as the publisher of Selling Electrons Magazine and Momentum Investor Magazine, both Apple Newsstand publications. He now speaks internationally for Celebrity Cruise Lines Beyond the Podium and Royal Caribbean Cruise Lines enrichment programs.

References

American publishers (people)
Year of birth missing (living people)
Living people
Texas Tech University School of Law alumni
University of Texas at El Paso alumni
Place of birth missing (living people)